The Northern Ireland Music Archive is a digital archive of materials related to music from Northern Ireland. It is based on a publicly accessible computer system situated in the Music Library at Belfast Central Library, Belfast, County Antrim. The archive has been funded and developed by the Arts Council of Northern Ireland.

History 
The first materials for the archive were provided by BBC Northern Ireland and were collated and digitised from 2003 onwards, with input and assistance provided by the Sonic Arts Research Centre and Belfast Central Library.

The archive was officially launched on 30 March 2006, with a day of music from numerous contemporary performers including the Brian Irvine Ensemble. At its launch, it contained approximately 400 recordings and a number of scanned sheet music of pieces by 20th-century and contemporary/classical composers born or settled in Northern Ireland. The Arts Council planned to enlarge this collection in the future, with the hope of expanding into other genres of music such as folk, rock and pop.

In 2007, a selection of folk and traditional materials were incorporated from a sizeable collection of tapes bequeathed by local folk promoter and journalist, Geoff Harden. This set of materials was digitised with additional assistance from the City of Belfast School of Music. The new additions were profiled at an official event at the library, which featured live music from local traditional musicians and a speech and song from veteran folk/traditional singer, Len Graham.

Materials 
The Northern Ireland Music Archive features digitised materials of numerous formats:

Audio recordings 
 Live performances of classical/contemporary compositions by composers from Northern Ireland
 Interview footage of composers from Northern Ireland
 Radio documentaries on composers and the Northern Irish classical/contemporary music scene
 Live performances by folk/traditional musicians recorded in Northern Ireland

Recordings date from the 1960s up to the present.

Visual articles 
 Sheet music of pieces by composers from Northern Ireland
 Programme notes from premiere (or otherwise notable) performances of pieces by Northern Ireland composers
 Publications relating to the Northern Irish folk scene, including issues of Ulster Folk News
 Photographs of composers and musicians

Access 
The archive is housed on a computer server in the Music Library, 2nd Floor, Belfast Central Library. The computer is free to browse at any time during library opening hours; the materials are available for reference only.

References

External links 
 Northern Ireland Composers - Arts Council of Northern Ireland web site, providing listings of the contemporary/classical materials held in the Northern Ireland Music Archive.

Archives in Northern Ireland
Music archives
Music organisations based in Northern Ireland